A bug bounty program is a deal offered by many websites, organizations and software developers by which individuals can receive recognition and compensation for reporting bugs, especially those pertaining to security exploits and vulnerabilities. 

These programs allow the developers to discover and resolve bugs before the general public is aware of them, preventing incidents of widespread abuse and data breaches. Bug bounty programs have been implemented by a large number of organizations, including Mozilla, Facebook, Yahoo!, Google, Reddit, Square, Microsoft, and the Internet bug bounty.

Companies outside the technology industry, including traditionally conservative organizations like the United States Department of Defense, have started using bug bounty programs. The Pentagon's use of bug bounty programs is part of a posture shift that has seen several US Government Agencies reverse course from threatening white hat hackers with legal recourse to inviting them to participate as part of a comprehensive vulnerability disclosure framework or policy.

History 
Hunter and Ready initiated the first known bug bounty program in 1983 for their Versatile Real-Time Executive operating system. Anyone who found and reported a bug would receive a Volkswagen Beetle ( Bug) in return.

A little over a decade later in 1995, Jarrett Ridlinghafer, a technical support engineer at Netscape Communications Corporation coined the phrase 'Bug Bounty'.

Netscape encouraged its employees to push themselves and do whatever it takes to get the job done. Ridlinghafer recognized that Netscape had many product enthusiasts and evangelists, some of which could even be considered fanatical about Netscape's browsers. He started to investigate the phenomenon in more detail and discovered that many of Netscape's enthusiasts were actually software engineers who were fixing the product's bugs on their own and publishing the fixes or workarounds, either in online news forums that had been set up by Netscape's technical support department, or on the unofficial "Netscape U-FAQ" website, which listed all known bugs and features of the browser, as well as instructions regarding workarounds and fixes.

Ridlinghafer thought the company should leverage these resources and proposed the 'Netscape Bugs Bounty Program', which he presented to his manager, who in turn suggested that Ridlinghafer present it at the next company executive team meeting. At the next executive team meeting, which was attended by James Barksdale, Marc Andreessen and the VPs of every department including product engineering, each member was given a copy of the 'Netscape Bugs Bounty Program' proposal and Ridlinghafer was invited to present his idea to the Netscape Executive Team. Everyone at the meeting embraced the idea except the VP of Engineering, who did not want it to go forward believing it to be a waste of time and resources. However, the VP of Engineering was overruled and Ridlinghafer was given an initial $50k budget to run with the proposal.

On October 10 1995, Netscape launched the first technology bug bounty program for the Netscape Navigator 2.0 Beta browser.

Vulnerability Disclosure Policy controversy 

In August 2013, a Palestinian computer science student reported a vulnerability that allowed anyone to post a video on an arbitrary Facebook account. According to the email communication between the student and Facebook, he attempted to report the vulnerability using Facebook's bug bounty program but the student was misunderstood by Facebook's engineers. Later he exploited the vulnerability using the Facebook profile of Mark Zuckerberg, resulting into Facebook refusing to pay him a bounty.

Facebook started paying researchers who find and report security bugs by issuing them custom branded "White Hat" debit cards that can be reloaded with funds each time the researchers discover new flaws. "Researchers who find bugs and security improvements are rare, and we value them and have to find ways to reward them," Ryan McGeehan, former manager of Facebook's security response team, told CNET in an interview. "Having this exclusive black card is another way to recognize them. They can show up at a conference and show this card and say 'I did special work for Facebook.'" In 2014, Facebook stopped issuing debit cards to researchers.

In 2016, Uber experienced a security incident when an individual accessed the personal information of 57 million Uber users worldwide. The individual supposedly demanded a ransom of $100,000 in order to destroy rather than publish the data. In Congressional testimony, Uber CISO indicated that the company verified that the data had been destroyed before paying the $100,000. Mr. Flynn expressed regret that Uber did not disclose the incident in 2016. As part of their response to this incident, Uber worked with partner HackerOne to update their bug bounty program policies to, among other things, more thoroughly explain good faith vulnerability research and disclosure.

Yahoo! was severely criticized for sending out Yahoo! T-shirts as reward to the Security Researchers for finding and reporting security vulnerabilities in Yahoo!, sparking what came to be called T-shirt-gate. High-Tech Bridge, a Geneva, Switzerland-based security testing company issued a press release saying Yahoo! offered $12.50 in credit per vulnerability, which could be used toward Yahoo-branded items such as T-shirts, cups and pens from its store. Ramses Martinez, director of Yahoo's security team claimed later in a blog post that he was behind the voucher reward program, and that he basically had been paying for them out of his own pocket. Eventually, Yahoo! launched its new bug bounty program on October 31 of the same year, that allows security researchers to submit bugs and receive rewards between $250 and $15,000, depending on the severity of the bug discovered.

Similarly, when Ecava released the first known bug bounty program for ICS in 2013, they were criticized for offering store credits instead of cash which does not incentivize security researchers. Ecava explained that the program was intended to be initially restrictive and focused on the human safety perspective for the users of IntegraXor SCADA, their ICS software.

Geography 

Though submissions for bug bounties come from many countries, a handful of countries tend to submit more bugs and receive more bounties. The United States and India are the top countries from which researchers submit bugs. India, which has either the first or second largest number of bug hunters in the world, depending on which report one cites, topped the Facebook Bug Bounty Program with the largest number of valid bugs. "India came out on top with the number of valid submissions in 2017, with the United States and Trinidad and Tobago in second and third place, respectively", Facebook quoted in a post.

Notable programs 

In October 2013, Google announced a major change to its Vulnerability Reward Program. Previously, it had been a bug bounty program covering many Google products. With the shift, however, the program was broadened to include a selection of high-risk free software applications and libraries, primarily those designed for networking or for low-level operating system functionality. Submissions that Google found adherent to the guidelines would be eligible for rewards ranging from $500 to $3,133.70. In 2017, Google expanded their program to cover vulnerabilities found in applications developed by third parties and made available through the Google Play Store. Google's Vulnerability Rewards Program now includes vulnerabilities found in Google, Google Cloud, Android, and Chrome products, and rewards up to $31,337.

Microsoft and Facebook partnered in November 2013 to sponsor The Internet Bug Bounty, a program to offer rewards for reporting hacks and exploits for a broad range of Internet-related software. In 2017, GitHub and The Ford Foundation sponsored the initiative, which is managed by volunteers including from Uber, Microsoft, Adobe, HackerOne, GitHub, NCC Group, and Signal Sciences. The software covered by the IBB includes Adobe Flash, Python, Ruby, PHP, Django, Ruby on Rails, Perl, OpenSSL, Nginx, Apache HTTP Server, and Phabricator. In addition, the program offered rewards for broader exploits affecting widely used operating systems and web browsers, as well as the Internet as a whole.

In March 2016, Peter Cook announced the US federal government's first bug bounty program, the "Hack the Pentagon" program. The program ran from April 18 to May 12 and over 1,400 people submitted 138 unique valid reports through HackerOne. In total, the US Department of Defense paid out $71,200.

In 2019, The European Commission announced the EU-FOSSA 2 bug bounty initiative for popular open source projects, including Drupal, Apache Tomcat, VLC, 7-zip and KeePass. The project was co-facilitated by European bug bounty platform Intigriti and HackerOne and resulted in a total of 195 unique and valid vulnerabilities. 

Open Bug Bounty is a crowd security bug bounty program established in 2014 that allows individuals to post website and web application security vulnerabilities in the hope of a reward from affected website operators.

Center for Analysis and Investigation of Cyber Attacks (TSARKA), a cybersecurity company of Kazakhstan, on December 8th, 2021, launched a National vulnerability reward program called BugBounty.kz. Among the private companies, governmental information systems and information resources have joined the program. Since the launch and up until October 28th, 2021, 1039 vulnerability reports were submitted. During the operation of the program several critical vulnerabilities were reported that could have led to the personal data leak from the critical infrastructure and possible manipulation of SCADA systems responsible for the city life support.

See also 
 Bounty hunter 
 Cyber-arms industry
 Knuth reward check (Program in 1980)
 List of unsolved problems in computer science
 List of unsolved problems in mathematics
 Market for zero-day exploits
 Open-source bounty
 White hat (computer security)
 Zerodium

References

Internet security
Cyberwarfare
Competitions
Hacking (computer security)